Fostoria High School is a public high school in Fostoria, Ohio.  It is the largest high school in the Fostoria Community Schools district.  Their nickname is the Redmen.  They are currently members of the Northern Buckeye Conference.

Ohio High School Athletic Association State Championships

 Boys Football – 1991, 1996

Notable alumni
Richard Neusome (American football), former NFL player (New Orleans Saints)
 Micah Hyde, NFL player (Buffalo Bills)
 Grant Jackson, former MLB player (Philadelphia Phillies, Baltimore Orioles, New York Yankees, Pittsburgh Pirates, Montreal Expos, Kansas City Royals) 
 Damon Moore, former NFL player (Philadelphia Eagles, Chicago Bears)

External links
 District Website
 School Calendar
 Fostoria High School website

Notes and references

High schools in Wood County, Ohio
Fostoria, Ohio
Public high schools in Ohio
Public middle schools in Ohio